"Who's Lonely Now" is a song written by Kix Brooks and Don Cook and recorded by American country music group Highway 101.  It was released in September 1989 as the first single from their album Paint the Town.  The song was Highway 101's ninth country hit and the last of four number one country hits.  The single went to number one for two weeks and spent a total of twenty-six weeks on the country singles charts.

Chart performance

Year-end charts

References

1989 singles
Highway 101 songs
Songs written by Kix Brooks
Songs written by Don Cook
Song recordings produced by Paul Worley
Warner Records singles
1989 songs